The following outline is provided as an overview of and topical guide to regression analysis:

Regression analysis – use of statistical techniques for learning about the relationship between one or more dependent variables (Y) and one or more independent variables (X).

Overview articles

 Regression analysis
 Linear regression

Non-statistical articles related to regression
 Least squares
 Linear least squares (mathematics)
 Non-linear least squares
 Least absolute deviations
 Curve fitting
 Smoothing
 Cross-sectional study

Basic statistical ideas related to regression
 Conditional expectation
 Correlation
 Correlation coefficient
 Mean square error
 Residual sum of squares
 Explained sum of squares
 Total sum of squares

Visualization
 Scatterplot

Linear regression based on least squares
 General linear model
 Ordinary least squares
 Generalized least squares
 Simple linear regression
 Trend estimation
 Ridge regression
 Polynomial regression
 Segmented regression
 Nonlinear regression

Generalized linear models

 Generalized linear models
 Logistic regression
Multinomial logit
Ordered logit
 Probit model
Multinomial probit
 Ordered probit
 Poisson regression
 Maximum likelihood
 Cochrane–Orcutt estimation

Computation
Numerical methods for linear least squares

Inference for regression models
 F-test
 t-test
 Lack-of-fit sum of squares
 Confidence band
 Coefficient of determination
 Multiple correlation
 Scheffé's method

Challenges to regression modeling

 Autocorrelation
 Cointegration
 Multicollinearity
 Homoscedasticity and heteroscedasticity
 Lack of fit
 Non-normality of errors
 Outliers

Diagnostics for regression models
 Regression model validation
 Studentized residual
 Cook's distance
 Variance inflation factor
 DFFITS
 Partial residual plot
 Partial regression plot
 Leverage
 Durbin–Watson statistic
 Condition number

Formal aids to model selection

 Model selection
 Mallows's Cp
 Akaike information criterion
 Bayesian information criterion
 Hannan–Quinn information criterion
 Cross validation

Robust regression

 Robust regression

Terminology

 Linear model — relates to meaning of "linear"
 Dependent and independent variables
 Errors and residuals in statistics
 Hat matrix
 Trend-stationary process
 Cross-sectional data
 Time series

Methods for dependent data

 Mixed model
 Random effects model
 Hierarchical linear models

Nonparametric regression

 Nonparametric regression
 Isotonic regression

Semiparametric regression
 Semiparametric regression
 Local regression

Other forms of regression

 Total least squares regression
 Deming regression
 Errors-in-variables model
 Instrumental variables regression
 Quantile regression
 Generalized additive model
 Autoregressive model
 Moving average model
 Autoregressive moving average model
 Autoregressive integrated moving average
 Autoregressive conditional heteroskedasticity

See also
 
 Prediction
 Design of experiments
 Data transformation
 Box–Cox transformation
 Machine learning
 Analysis of variance
 Causal inference

Regression analysis
Regression analysis
 Outline
Regression analysis